Victor Lucas (23 March 1907 – 2 December 1979) was an  Australian rules footballer who played with St Kilda in the Victorian Football League (VFL).

Notes

External links 

1907 births
1979 deaths
Australian rules footballers from New South Wales
St Kilda Football Club players